Julio Gabriel López Venegas (born November 4, 1978), referred as Julio Lopez, is a Chilean former footballer who played for clubs in Chile, Indonesia, Mexico and Switzerland.

Career 

Lopez started his career in his country of birth with the clubs Barnechea, San Luis de Quillota and Magallanes. In 2002, he joined PSIS Semarang, he scored 16 goals for PSIS Semarang in a season.

On 2003 season, Lopez moved to Persib Bandung following the invitation from fellow Chilean Persib coach, Juan Páez. He scored 7 goals for the Persib in the first round of 2004 Liga Indonesia Premier Division. In the second half of the season, Lopez's name disappeared from the player roster Persib Bandung because of his lack of discipline factor. So, he moved to Mexico and joined Atlante, being loaned to Potros Neza in the Primera División 'A', where he coincided with the Chileans Francisco Huaiquipán and Joel Soto. After a step in Switzerland with St. Gallen and FC Vaduz, in 2006 he returned to Chile and joined Universidad de Chile in the Chilean top flight, making 5 appearances.

Lopez then joined PSM Makassar. Despite being a new player, then coach Raja Isa did not hesitate to give him the captain's armband to replace Syamsul Bachri Chaeruddin. At club PSM Makassar, Lopez did not take long to adapt to the environment and new friends. The proof he was able to show increased performance in every appearance with PSM Makassar.

Entering the 2009 - 2010 season of ISL, Lopez joined in Persiba Balikpapan. He retired in 2013 playing for Persikabo Bogor, where he coincided with the Chilean Alejandro Tobar.

Personal life 
Lopez played in Indonesia since 2002. He had played in Mexican, Europe and Chilean Leagues since 2004 before went back to Indonesia in 2008, he decided to quit the League of Indonesia due of personal reason. While living in Indonesia, he was called "J-Lo" by fans of Persib Bandung during his spell there and he also launched a sneaker brand with his name.

References

External links
 
 
 Julio Lopez at PlaymakerStats

1978 births
Living people
People from Quillota
Chilean Christians
Chilean footballers
Chilean expatriate footballers
Tercera División de Chile players
A.C. Barnechea footballers
San Luis de Quillota footballers
Primera B de Chile players
Deportes Magallanes footballers
Magallanes footballers
Persela Lamongan players
Indonesian Premier League players
PSIS Semarang players
Persib Bandung players
Persijap Jepara players
Liga MX players
Ascenso MX players
Atlante F.C. footballers
Swiss Super League players
FC St. Gallen players
Swiss Challenge League players
FC Vaduz players
Chilean Primera División players
Universidad de Chile footballers
Liga 1 (Indonesia) players
PSM Makassar players
Persiba Balikpapan players
Persisam Putra Samarinda players
Persija Jakarta players
Liga 2 (Indonesia) players
Persikabo Bogor players
Chilean expatriate sportspeople in Indonesia
Chilean expatriate sportspeople in Mexico
Chilean expatriate sportspeople in Switzerland
Chilean expatriate sportspeople in Liechtenstein
Expatriate footballers in Indonesia
Expatriate footballers in Mexico
Expatriate footballers in Switzerland
Expatriate footballers in Liechtenstein
Association football forwards